Jallah Arain is a town city of Lodhran District in the South side of the Punjab province of Pakistan. It is located 3 kilometers away on the side of Multan-Bahawalpur main road.

Infrastructure
There is a road starting at the Bus stop Jallah Moor on the Multan-Bahawalpur road, which leads to Jallah Arain.

Education
There are two government schools in the region:
 Govt. Girls Higher Secondary School, Jallah Arain
 Govt. High School (for Boys), Jallah Arain. Govt. Boys High School is now upgraded to the Govt. Higher Secondary School (Boys) Jallah Arain. 
Other than the government schools, there are a few private schools and tuition institutes as well in the area.

References

External links
 https://web.archive.org/web/20110807200025/http://www.nrb.gov.pk/lg_election/union.asp?district=17&dn=Lodhran
 http://www.pap.gov.pk/index.php/members/profile/en/19/472
 https://www.pakstudy.com/forum/index.php?topic=1733.0
Populated places in Lodhran District